Cao Keqiang (born October 1921) is a Chinese diplomat.

Career 
Cao was Ambassador of the People's Republic of China to Syria (1968–1974), Dominion of Ceylon now Sri Lanka (1969–1970), Sweden (1979–1982), Djibouti (1982–1983) and France (1983–1986).

Footnotes

1921 births
Possibly living people
Ambassadors of China to Syria
Ambassadors of China to Sri Lanka
Ambassadors of China to Sweden
Ambassadors of China to Djibouti
Ambassadors of China to France
Members of the 6th Chinese People's Political Consultative Conference
Members of the 7th Chinese People's Political Consultative Conference
Members of the 8th Chinese People's Political Consultative Conference
People of the Republic of China
Chinese Communist Party politicians from Shanxi
People's Republic of China politicians from Shanxi
Politicians from Taiyuan